Alexander Edgar Lascelles, Viscount Lascelles (born 13 May 1980) is an English chef, and the third child and second son of David Lascelles, 8th Earl of Harewood, and his first wife Margaret, Viscountess Lascelles. He is heir apparent to the earldom of Harewood, due to his elder brother having been born before their parents' marriage. He is a great-great-grandson of George V.

A chef, Lascelles has also taught about food at the John of Gaunt School, Trowbridge.

Personal life
Lascelles' first child, Leo, was born out of wedlock and is unable to succeed to his grandfather's earldom. On 18 August 2017 at Kew Gardens, Alexander Lascelles married Annika Elizabeth Reed (b. 1984). They have a daughter, Ivy, born in 2018.

As he is in the line of succession to the throne, under the Royal Marriages Act 1772, until 2015 Lascelles needed royal permission to marry.

Ancestry
The following table shows five generations.

Notes

Ancestry
The following table shows five generations.

1980 births
Living people
British chefs
British courtesy viscounts
British people of Austrian-Jewish descent
Alexander